Guillermo Tapia (born 16 June 1942) is a Mexican sailor. He competed in the Flying Dutchman event at the 1984 Summer Olympics.

References

External links
 

1942 births
Living people
Mexican male sailors (sport)
Olympic sailors of Mexico
Sailors at the 1984 Summer Olympics – Flying Dutchman
Place of birth missing (living people)